Oshiyan is a village in Chaboksar District, Gilan Province, Iran. It located in the least distance between the Alborz height and the Caspian Sea with most 1500 m width. Due to this geographical situation, it has an excellent four-season climate fit for growing flowers and shrubs—many garden greenhouses export their flowers and plants to the national and international market.
 Oshiyan has a sandy golden shore that is right for sunbath and swimming. Its flourishing forest is suitable for camping and mountain climbing, many residential complexes such as Ahovan, Shaghayegh, and Holiday hotel entertain tourists in this region. Jet skis and Paracel, fishing, boating, and horse riding are the main tourist fun. A famous Ramsar's green roof complex with cable car, carting, and funfair is adjacent (2 km) to this area.

References

External links

 Official website (in Persian)

Populated places in Rudsar County